The 2020 Africa Movie Academy Awards ceremony was held on Sunday 20 December 2020 online at the AMAA website due to the COVID-19 pandemic. The award night was hosted by Lorenzo Menakaya. After the film entries were submitted, the date for the announcement of nominees was shifted from 20 November to 30 November. Knuckle City led with 10 nominations followed by Desrances with 10 nominations. The Milkmaid won the most awards including Best film in an African language, Best film and Best Nigerian film.

Awards 

Winners are listed first and highlighted in boldface.

References 

2020 in Nigeria
21st century in Lagos
Africa Movie Academy Awards ceremonies
Events in Lagos
2020 film awards